Chutchawal Khawlaor (born January 17, 1988) is a Thai taekwondo practitioner.

Khawlaor also be a volunteer for Ruamkatanyu Foundation.

References

External links
 
 

Living people
Chutchawal Khawlaor
Chutchawal Khawlaor
Taekwondo practitioners at the 2008 Summer Olympics
1988 births
Asian Games medalists in taekwondo
Taekwondo practitioners at the 2010 Asian Games
Chutchawal Khawlaor
Medalists at the 2010 Asian Games
Universiade medalists in taekwondo
Chutchawal Khawlaor
Chutchawal Khawlaor
Southeast Asian Games medalists in taekwondo
Competitors at the 2005 Southeast Asian Games
Chutchawal Khawlaor
Chutchawal Khawlaor
World Taekwondo Championships medalists
Asian Taekwondo Championships medalists
Medalists at the 2007 Summer Universiade
Medalists at the 2009 Summer Universiade
Chutchawal Khawlaor
Chutchawal Khawlaor